Dajani or al-Dajani is a Middle Eastern surname. Notable people with this name include:
Abdelrahman al-Dajani, 19th-century mayor of Jerusalem
Dana Dajani, Palestinian actress and writer
Daniel Dajani (1906–1946), Albanian martyr
Geeby Dajani, American music producer with Stimulated Dummies
Jamal Dajani (born 1957), Palestinian-American journalist and television producer
Karma Dajani, Lebanese-Dutch mathematician
Kobi Dajani (born 1984), Israeli footballer
Nadia Dajani (born 1965), American actress of Irish and Palestinian ancestry
Nijmeddin Dajani, Jordanian economist and ambassador
Omar Dajani (born 1970), Palestinian-American legal scholar
Rana Dajani, Jordanian molecular biologist